Immanuel Church or Immanuel Lutheran Church, Immanuel Evangelical Church, or Immanuel Evangelical Lutheran Church may refer to:

in Israel
Immanuel Church (Tel Aviv-Yafo)

in the United States (by state)
Immanuel Evangelical Lutheran Church (Boise, Idaho)
Immanuel Hall, Hinsdale, Illinois, formerly known as Immanuel Evangelical Church
Immanuel Lutheran Church (Valparaiso, Indiana)
Immanuel Lutheran Church (Red Wing, Minnesota)
Immanuel Lutheran Church (Altenburg, Missouri)
Immanuel Lutheran Church (Perryville, Missouri)
Immanuel Evangelical Lutheran Church (Pilot Knob, Missouri)
Immanuel Lutheran Church (Springer, New Mexico), listed on the National Register of Historic Places
Immanuel Lutheran Church (Murdo, South Dakota)
Immanuel Lutheran Church (Zeona, South Dakota)
Immanuel Church (La Grange, Tennessee)
Immanuel Lutheran Church (Houston, Texas)
Immanuel Lutheran Church (Seattle, Washington)

See also
Emmanuel Lutheran Church (disambiguation)